Croptilon is a small North American genus of flowering plants in the tribe Astereae within the family Asteraceae.

 Species
Croptilon is native to the southeastern and south-central United States as well as northeastern Mexico.
 Croptilon divaricatum (Nutt.) Raf. - south-central + southeastern USA
 Croptilon hookerianum (Torr. & A.Gray) House - south-central USA
 Croptilon rigidifolium (E.B.Sm.) E.B.Sm. - Texas, Nuevo León

References

Flora of North America
Asteraceae genera
Astereae
Taxa named by Constantine Samuel Rafinesque